Machines That Think is a compilation of 29 science fiction stories probing the scientific, spiritual, and moral facets of computers and robots and speculating on their future. It was edited by Isaac Asimov, Martin H. Greenberg, and Patricia S. Warrick.

Published in 1984 by Holt, Rinehart, and Winston, it features a foreword by Asimov, the creator of the Three Laws of Robotics. In addition, each story has introductory notes by Warrick, author of The Cybernetic Imagination in Science Fiction, explaining the significance of the story in the context of science fiction's evolution of ideas concerning artificial intelligence. This book is a companion piece to that book, providing the source material upon which Warrick's analysis is based.

Stories included

External links
 

1984 books
Science fiction anthologies
Holt, Rinehart and Winston books